Xavier le Draoullec (born 26 July 1961) is a Paralympic retired athlete from France who competes mainly in category F44 long jump events.

Biography
le Draoullec was a member of the 8th RPIMa regiment in Castres in 1979, he joined the Corps of Infantry Parachute Troops of the Navy until 1985. He lost the lower part of his left leg after stepping onto a landmine while on mission in Lebanon in 1982. Following his injury, he was awarded the Military Medal in October 1982, he had also gained Knight of the National Order of Merit in 2000, Knight of the National Order of the Legion of Honor in 2002 and Officer of the National Order of Merit in 2004.

Sporting career
Xavier le Draoullec first competed in the 2000 Summer Paralympics in the T44 400m and F44 long jump before combining with his French teammates to win silver in the 4 × 100 m relay and bronze in the 4 × 400 m relay.

Draoullec competed in the 2004 Summer Paralympics in the long jump and pentathlon, as well as winning a bronze and silver medal as part of the French relay teams in the 4 × 400 m and 4 × 100 m team events, respectively.  He returned to the 2008 Summer Paralympics, competing in the 4 × 100 m relay and the long jump.

References

External links
 

1961 births
Living people
Athletes from Paris
Paralympic athletes of France
Athletes (track and field) at the 2000 Summer Paralympics
Athletes (track and field) at the 2004 Summer Paralympics
Athletes (track and field) at the 2008 Summer Paralympics
Paralympic silver medalists for France
Paralympic bronze medalists for France
Medalists at the 2000 Summer Paralympics
Medalists at the 2004 Summer Paralympics
French male sprinters
French male long jumpers
Paralympic medalists in athletics (track and field)
20th-century French people
21st-century French people
Sprinters with limb difference
Long jumpers with limb difference
Paralympic sprinters
Paralympic long jumpers